In statistics, Bhattacharyya angle, also called statistical angle, is a measure of distance between two probability measures defined on a finite probability space.  It is defined as

 

where pi, qi are the probabilities assigned to the point i, for i = 1, ..., n, and

 

is the Bhattacharya coefficient.

The Bhattacharya distance is the geodesic distance in the orthant of the sphere  obtained by projecting the probability simplex on the sphere by the transformation .

This distance is compatible with Fisher metric. It is also related to Bures distance and fidelity between quantum states as for two diagonal states one has

See also 

 Bhattacharyya distance
 Hellinger distance

References 

Statistical distance
Anil Kumar Bhattacharya